In Germany and Switzerland, a Landeskirche (plural: Landeskirchen) is the church of a region. The term usually refers to Protestant churches, but—in case of Switzerland—also Roman Catholic dioceses. They originated as the national churches of the independent states, States of Germany (Länder) or Cantons of Switzerland (Kantone, Cantons, Cantoni), that later unified to form modern Germany (in 1871) or modern Switzerland (in 1848), respectively.

Origins in the Holy Roman Empire
In the pre-Reformation era, the organization of the church within a land was understood as a landeskirche, certainly under a higher power (the pope or a patriarch), but also possessing an increased measure of independence, especially as concerning its internal structure and its relations to its king, prince or ruler. Unlike in Scandinavia and England, the bishops in the national churches did not survive the Reformation, making it impossible for a conventional diocesan system to continue within Lutheranism. Therefore, Martin Luther demanded that, as a stop-gap, each secular Landesherr (territorial lord, monarch or a body, like the governments of republican Imperial estates, such as Free Imperial Cities or Swiss cantons) should exercise episcopal functions in the respective territories. The principle of cuius regio, eius religio also arose out of the Reformation, and according to this a Landesherr chose what denomination his subjects had to belong to. This led to closed, insular landeskirchen. The principle was a byproduct of religious politics in the Holy Roman Empire and soon softened after the Thirty Years' War.

At the time of the abolition of the monarchies in Germany in 1918, the Landesherren were summus episcopus (Landesbischöfe, comparable to the Supreme Governor of the Church of England) in the states or their administrative areas, and the ties between churches and nations came to be particularly close, even with Landesherren outside the Lutheran church. So the (Roman Catholic) king of Bavaria was at the same time supreme governor (summus episcopus) of the Evangelical Lutheran Church in Bavaria right of the river Rhine. In practice, the Landesherren exercised episcopal functions (summepiscopacy) only indirectly through consistories ( [sg./pl.]).

In Germany

List of Landeskirchen in 1922 with changes until 1945

Those of the following Landeskirchen, which existed in 1922, founded the new umbrella German Evangelical Church Confederation (1922–1933). There were mergers in the 1920s and under Nazi reign in 1933 and 1934.

The first date given before every entry in the table below refers to the year, when the respective church body was constituted. Such a date of constitution is somewhat difficult to fix for the 19th century, when church constitutions were reformed and came into effect, which usually provided for more or less state-independent legislative and executive bodies more or less elected by parishioners. The Protestant Reformation and some church organisation (Kirchenordnung) of course existed long before.

For the 20th century the given years refer to the formal establishment of the respective church body. The second date refers to the year, when the respective church body ceased to exist (if so), due to a merger or unwinding. The third entry gives the name of each church body alphabetically assorted by the first territorial entity mentioned in the name. This makes sense because Landeskirchen have clear regional demarcations, therefore usually somehow mentioned in their names. The post-World War I church bodies, listed below, have never existed all in the same time. One can sort the table below alphabetically or chronologically by clicking on the button with the gyronny of four.

{| class="sortable wikitable" width="100%"
|- class="hintergrundfarbe5"
! width = "6%" | Consti-tuted in
! width = "6%" | Merged in
! width = "22%" | Name of the church body 
! width = "8%" | Denomination
! width = "24%"| Number of souls and territorial ambit
! width = "34%"; class=unsortable | Remarks
|- valign=top
| 19th century
| persisting
| AnhaltEvangelical State Church of Anhalt
| United by confession
|  parishioners (1922)Free State of Anhalt
| The Church body comprises only congregations of united confession. The official church body became a destroyed church, since it was taken over by Nazi-submissive German Christians, who gained a majority in the synod by the unconstitutional election imposed by Hitler on 23 July 1933. Nazi opponents formed the Confessing Church of Anhalt.
|- valign=top
| 1821
| persisting 
| BadenUnited Evangelical Protestant State Church of Baden
| United by confession
|  parishioners (1922)the Republic of Baden
| The new name replaced the prior United Evangelical Protestant Church of the Grand Duchy of Baden in 1920, when the new church constitution accounted for the Grand Duchy having become a republic. The Church body comprises only congregations of united confession. The official church body became a destroyed church, since it was taken over by Nazi-submissive German Christians, who gained a majority in the synod by the unconstitutional election imposed by Hitler on 23 July 1933. Nazi opponents formed the Confessing Church of Baden. 
|- valign=top
| 1809
| persisting 
| BavariaEvangelical Lutheran Church in Bavaria right of the river Rhine
| Lutheran
|  parishioners (1925)Free State of Bavaria right of the Rhine, thus except of the then Bavarian Governorate of the Palatinate, which formed a separate church body since 1848. In 1918 the Reformed congregations earlier subsumed within the Bavaria church body seceded and founded the independent Evangelical Reformed Church in Bavaria (see Further Protestant church bodies in Germany). On 1 April 1921 the Evangelical Lutheran State Church of Saxe-Coburg merged in the Bavaria church body. 
| The new name replaced the prior Protestant State Church in the Kingdom of Bavaria right of the river Rhine in 1921, when the new church constitution accounted for the Kingdom having become a republic and the Reformed congregations having formed a separate church body. The Bavaria official church body remained an intact church, since the Nazi-submissive German Christians remained a minority in the synod after the unconstitutional election imposed by Hitler on 23 July 1933. Nazi opponents of the Confessing Church could act within the church body.
|- valign=top
| 1843
| 1934 
| BirkenfeldEvangelical Church of the Region of Birkenfeld
| United by confession
|  parishioners (1922)The Oldenburgian exclave of the Region of Birkenfeld. In 1934 the 
Birkenfeld church body merged into the Evangelical Church of the old-Prussian Union, to be precise in its Ecclesiastical Province in the Rhineland.
| The new name replaced the prior Evangelical Church of the Principality of Birkenfeld after 1918, when the new Oldenburgian monarchy with its Principality of Birkenfeld had become a republic. The Church body comprised only congregations of united confession. The Ecclesiastical Province in the Rhineland, of which Birkenfeld had become a part, was a destroyed ecclesiastical province, since it was taken over by Nazi-submissive German Christians, who gained a majority in the provincial synod by the unconstitutional election imposed by Hitler on 23 July 1933. Nazi opponents formed the Confessing Church in the Rhineland. 
|- valign=top
| 1877
| persisting 
| Bremian Evangelical Church
| United in administration
|  parishioners (1922)Bremen city and one united congregation in the historical centre of Bremerhaven, which was extended by 1939 by prior Hanoveran suburbs, whose Lutheran parishes continue to belong to the Hanover Lutheran church body.
| The church body comprises mostly Reformed and less Lutheran congregations and one united congregation. The official church body became a destroyed church, since it was taken over by Nazi-submissive German Christians, who gained a majority in the synod by the unconstitutional election imposed by Hitler on 23 July 1933. Nazi opponents formed the Bremian Confessing Church. 
|- valign=top
| 1872
| persisting 
| Brunswickian Evangelical Lutheran State Church 
| Lutheran
|  parishioners (1922)Free State of Brunswick, when the state territory was altered in 1942, the Brunswick church body readjusted its ambit accordingly, ceding congregations to and receiving some from the Hanover Lutheran church body.
| The official church body became a destroyed church, since it was taken over by Nazi-submissive German Christians, who gained a majority in the synod by the unconstitutional election imposed by Hitler on 23 July 1933. Nazi opponents formed the Brunswickian Confessing Church. 
|- valign=top
| 1922
| 1933
| Frankfurt upon MainEvangelical State Church of Frankfurt upon Main
| United in administration
|  parishioners (1922)the formerly Free City of Frankfurt upon Main, in 1866 annexed by Prussia and since then part of the Prussian Province of Hesse-Nassau. In September 1933 the illegitimate church governing board merged the Frankfurt church body in the Evangelical State Church of Hesse-Nassau. 
| The official Frankfurt church body became a destroyed church, since it was taken over by Nazi-submissive German Christians, who gained a majority in the synod by the unconstitutional election imposed by Hitler on 23 July 1933. Nazi opponents formed the Confessing Church of Frankfurt. 
|- valign=top
| 1860
| 1976 
| HamburgEvangelical Lutheran Church in the Hamburgian State
| Lutheran
|  parishioners (1922)Free and Hanseatic City of Hamburg in its borders before the Greater Hamburg Act became effective on 1 April 1937, thus including Hamburg's then exclaves such as Cuxhaven, Geesthacht, and Großhansdorf, but without today's boroughs of Altona, Harburg, Wandsbek and further formerly Holsatian municipalities in the North Borough. 
| The official Hamburg church body became a destroyed church, since it was taken over by Nazi-submissive conservative Lutherans in May 1933 even before the German Christians gained a majority in the synod by the unconstitutional election imposed by Hitler on 23 July. Nazi opponents formed the Confessing Church of Hamburg. 
|- valign=top
| 1864
| persisting 
| Hanover LutheranEvangelical Lutheran State Church of Hanover
| Lutheran
|  parishioners (1922)Prussian Province of Hanover, the territorial changes of the province in 1937 (Greater Hamburg Act) were not followed by a change in ecclesiastical ambit. In 1939 (Greater Bremen, annexation of Hanoveran suburbs of Bremen to Bremen proper) and 1942, when the provincial territory was altered along the Brunswickian border, both church bodies readjusted their ambits accordingly, ceding congregations to and reveiving some from each other. 
| The official church body remained an intact church, since the Nazi-submissive German Christians remained a minority in the synod after the unconstitutional election imposed by Hitler on 23 July 1933. Nazi opponents of the Confessing Church could act within the church body.
|- valign=top
| 1882
| 1989
| Hanover ReformedEvangelical Reformed State Church of the Province of Hanover
| Reformed
|  parishioners (1922)Prussian Province of Hanover and some Reformed parishes in Hamburg and Schleswig-Holstein acceded since 1923. 
| The new name replaced the prior Evangelical Reformed Church of the Province of Hanover in 1922, when the Hanover Reformed church body caught up in terms of the title with the Hanover Lutheran church body. The official church body remained an intact church, since the Nazi-submissive German Christians remained a minority in the synod after the unconstitutional election imposed by Hitler on 23 July 1933. Nazi opponents of the Confessing Church could act within the church body.
|- valign=top
| 1873
| 1934 
| Hesse CasselEvangelical State Church of Hesse-Cassel
| United in administration
|  parishioners (1922)the former Electorate of Hesse, in 1866 annexed by Prussia and since then part of the latter's Province of Hesse-Nassau. Some small northern exclaves in today's Lower Saxony were ceded in the 1920s to the Hanover Lutheran church body. In 1934 the Hesse Cassel church body merged in the Evangelical Church of Electoral Hesse-Waldeck. 
| The official Hesse Cassel church body became a destroyed church, since it was taken over by Nazi-submissive German Christians, who gained a majority in the synod by the unconstitutional election imposed by Hitler on 23 July 1933. However, a merger, planned since 1926, with the Frankfurt, Hesse state and Nassau church bodies failed after quarrels about their Nazi radicalism. 
|- valign=top
| 1934
| persisting 
| Hesse Electorate and WaldeckEvangelical Church of Hesse Electorate-Waldeck 
| United in administration
| the former Electorate of Hesse, except of some small northern exclaves in today's Lower Saxony, and the former Free State of Waldeck-Pyrmont, except of the Pyrmont exclaves. 
| The official Hesse Electorate and Waldeck church body became a destroyed church, since it was merged from two destroyed church bodies. Nazi opponents formed the Confessing Church of Electoral Hesse-Waldeck. 
|- valign=top
| 19th century
| 1933
| Hesse stateEvangelical Church in Hesse
| United in administration
|  parishioners (1922)People's State of Hesse. In September 1933 the illegitimate church governing board merged the Hesse state church body in the Evangelical State Church of Hesse-Nassau. 
| The official Hesse state church body became a destroyed church, since it was taken over by Nazi-submissive German Christians, who gained a majority in the synod by the unconstitutional election imposed by Hitler on 23 July 1933. Nazi opponents formed the Confessing Church of Hesse. 
|- valign=top
| 1933
| 1945 
| Hesse-NassauEvangelical State Church Hesse-Nassau
| United in administration 
| formerly Free City of Frankfurt upon Main, former Duchy of Nassau, both covered by then Hesse-Nassau province, and the People's State of Hesse
| In September 1933 the destroyed Frankfurt, Hesse state, and Nassau church bodies merged in the new Hesse-Nassau church body, which thus became a new church body radically organised according to the Führerprinzip, thus anti-synodal and anti-presbyterial. With the end of the Nazi reign this church body was dissolved. Nazi opponents had organised along the church bodies merged into this church body. 
|- valign=top
| 1877
| persisting 
| Lippe State Church
| Reformed
|  parishioners (1922)Free State of Lippe. 
| Few Lutheran congregations have their own organisations within the else Reformed Lippe church body. 
|- valign=top
| 1895
| 1976 
| Lübeck city-stateEvangelical Lutheran Church in the Lübeckian State
| Lutheran
|  parishioners (1922)Free and Hanseatic City of Lübeck, the Lübeck state church body persisted also after Prussia had annexed the Lübeck state by in 1937 (Greater Hamburg Act), and its incorporation into the Prussian Schleswig-Holstein province. 
| The official Lübeck state church body became a destroyed church, since it was taken over by Nazi-submissive German Christians, who gained a majority in the synod by the unconstitutional election imposed by Hitler on 23 July 1933. Nazi opponents formed the Confessing Church of Lübeck state. 
|- valign=top
| 1921
| 1976 
| Lübeck regionEvangelical Lutheran State Church of the Oldenburgian Region of Lübeck
| Lutheran
| The Oldenburgian exclave of the Lübeck Region, the Lübeck region church body persisted also after Prussia had annexed the Lübeck Region in 1937 (Greater Hamburg Act), and its incorporation into the Prussian Schleswig-Holstein province. 
| The official Lübeck region church body became a destroyed church, since it was taken over by Nazi-submissive German Christians, who gained a majority in the synod by the unconstitutional election imposed by Hitler on 23 July 1933. However, its land provost (leading cleric) maintained a rather neutral position, so Nazi opponents of the Confessing Church could act within the official church body. 
|- valign=top
| 1835
| 1926 
| LusatiaLutheran Church in Upper Lusatia
| Lutheran
| the region of Kreishauptmannschaft Bautzen  of the then Free State of Saxony
| In 1926 the Lusatia church body merged in the Saxony state church body. 
|- valign=top
| 1850
| 1934 
| Mecklenburg-SchwerinEvangelical Lutheran Church of Mecklenburg-Schwerin| Lutheran
|  parishioners (1922)Free State of Mecklenburg-Schwerin. In 1934 the Mecklenburg-Schwerin church body merged in the Mecklenburg state church body. 
| The official Mecklenburg-Schwerin church body became a destroyed church, since it was taken over by Nazi-submissive German Christians, who gained a majority in the synod by the unconstitutional election imposed by Hitler on 23 July 1933. 
|- valign=top
| 19th century
| 1934 
| Mecklenburg-StrelitzMecklenburg-Strelitz State Church| Lutheran
|  parishioners (1922)Free State of Mecklenburg-Strelitz. In 1934 the Mecklenburg-Strelitz church body merged in the Mecklenburg state church body. 
| The official Mecklenburg-Strelitz church body became a destroyed church, since it was taken over by Nazi-submissive German Christians, who gained a majority in the synod by the unconstitutional election imposed by Hitler on 23 July 1933. State bishop Gerhard Tolzien was deposed.
|- valign=top
| 1934
| 2012 
| Mecklenburg (united state)Evangelical Lutheran State Church of Mecklenburg
| Lutheran
| former Free States of Mecklenburg-Schwerin and Mecklenburg-Strelitz. In 2012 the Mecklenburg church body merged in the new Evangelical Lutheran Church in Northern Germany. 
| The official Mecklenburg state church body became a destroyed church, since it was merged from two destroyed church bodies. Nazi opponents formed the Confessing Church in Mecklenburg. 
|- valign=top
| 1866
| 1933
| NassauEvangelical State Church in Nassau| United in administration
| former Duchy of Nassau, in 1866 annexed by Prussia and since then part of the Prussian Province of Hesse-Nassau. In September 1933 the illegitimate church governing board merged the Hesse state church body in the Evangelical State Church of Hesse-Nassau. 
| The official Hesse state church body became a destroyed church, since it was taken over by Nazi-submissive German Christians, who gained a majority in the synod by the unconstitutional election imposed by Hitler on 23 July 1933. Nazi opponents formed the Confessing Church of Nassau. 
|- valign=top
| 19th century
| persisting 
| OldenburgEvangelical Lutheran Church in Oldenburg
| Lutheran
|  parishioners (1922)Free State of Oldenburg except of its exclaves of Birkenfeld and Region of Lübeck. In 1921 the Lübeck region church body had seceded from the Oldenburg church body, while the Birkenfeld church body had never been part of the Oldenburg church body. 
| The official Oldenburg church body became a destroyed church, since it was taken over by Nazi-submissive German Christians, who gained a majority in the synod by the unconstitutional election imposed by Hitler on 23 July 1933. Nazi opponents formed the Confessing Church of Oldenburg. 
|- valign=top
| 1848
| persisting 
| PalatinateUnited Protestant Evangelical Christian Church of the Palatinate (Palatine State Church) 
| United by confession
|  parishioners (1922)the then Bavarian Governorate of the Palatinate and some eastern districts in Mandatory Saar (League of Nations).
| Since the parishioners' plesbiscite in 1817 all Palatine congregations are confessionally united. The official Palatinate church body became a destroyed church, since it was taken over by Nazi-submissive German Christians, who gained a majority in the synod by the unconstitutional election imposed by Hitler on 23 July 1933. Nazi opponents formed the Confessing Church of the Palatinate. 
|- valign=top
| 1817
| 2003 
| PrussiaEvangelical Church of the old-Prussian Unionabbreviations: ApU, EKapU 
| United in administration
|  parishioners (1922)the Prussian provinces of Berlin, Brandenburg, East Prussia, Hohenzollern, Pomerania, Posen-West Prussia, the Rhineland, Saxony, Silesia, and Westphalia as well as the League of Nations mandates of the Free City of Danzig, Klaipėda Region and the Saar (League of Nations), except of some eastern Palatine districts within the latter. All the parishes east of the Oder Neisse line, including the complete ecclesiastical provinces of Danzig, East Prussia and Posen-West Prussia vanished due to fleeing parishioners before the Soviet conquest and the subsequent violent expulsion of parishioners between 1945 and 1950, including many casualties. Also the bulk of the parishes in the Pomerania and Silesia ecclesiastical provinces were lost. 
| The new name replaced the prior Evangelical State Church of Prussia's older Provinces in 1922, accounting for the facts that the Weimar Constitution had done away with state churches in 1919, and that the old-Prussian congregations were then spreading over four sovereign states (Belgium, Czechoslovakia, Germany, and Poland) and three League of Nations mandates (Danzig, Klaipėda, and Saar) after the different post-World War I annexations. The new name was after a denomination, not after a state any more. It became a difficult task to maintain the unity of the church, with some of the annexing states being opposed to the fact that church bodies within their borders keep a union with German church organisations. The official old-Prussian church body became a destroyed church, since it was taken over by Nazi-submissive German Christians, who gained a majority in the general synod by the unconstitutional election imposed by Hitler on 23 July 1933. Only the Westphalia ecclesiastical province remained an intact church, since the German Christians did not gain the majority in its provincial synod, while all the other old-Prussian ecclesiastical provinces within Germany were taken over by German Christians as well. The Nazi opponents formed parallel Confessing Church institutions on the old-Prussian general level as well as in the destroyed ecclesiastical provinces. 
|- valign=top
| 19th century
| 1934 
| ReussEvangelical Lutheran Church in Reuss Elder Line| Lutheran
|  parishioners (1922)former Principality of Reuss Elder Line within the then State of Thuringia.
| The Reuss church body was a stronghold of Lutheran Orthodoxy and refused the merger with the other seven church bodies in Thuringia in 1920. However, in 1934 Reuss merged in the Thuringia church body. 
|- valign=top
| 1868
| persisting
| SaxonyEvangelical Lutheran State Church of the Free State of Saxony 
| Lutheran
|  parishioners (1922)until 1926 the then Free State of Saxony except of the region of Kreishauptmannschaft Bautzen , from 1926 on all the Free State of Saxony. All the parishes east of the Oder Neisse line vanished due to fleeing parishioners before the Soviet conquest and the subsequent violent expulsion of parishioners between 1945 and 1950, including casualties. 
| The new name came along with the new church constitution of 1922. The official Saxony church body became a destroyed church, since it was taken over by Nazi-submissive German Christians, who gained a majority in the synod by the unconstitutional election imposed by Hitler on 23 July 1933. Nazi opponents formed the Confessing Church of Saxony. 
|- valign=top
| 19th century
| persisting
| Schaumburg-LippeEvangelical Lutheran State Church of Schaumburg-Lippe 
| Lutheran
|  parishioners (1922)Free State of Schaumburg-Lippe
| The Schaumburg-Lippe official church body remained an intact church, since the Nazi-submissive German Christians remained a minority in the synod after the unconstitutional election imposed by Hitler on 23 July 1933. Nazi opponents of the Confessing Church could act within the church body. Even the more, in 1936 the German Christian minority was excluded from the executive board, which was then only staffed with partisans of the Nazi-opponent Confessing Church. 
|- valign=top
| 1867
| 1976 
| Schleswig-HolsteinEvangelical Lutheran Church of Schleswig-Holstein| Lutheran
|  parishioners (1922)Province of Schleswig-Holstein in its borders of 1921 to 1936.
| The official Schleswig-Holstein church body became a destroyed church, since it was taken over by Nazi-submissive German Christians, who gained a majority in the synod by the unconstitutional election imposed by Hitler on 23 July 1933. Nazi opponents formed the Confessing Church of Schleswig-Holstein. 
|- valign=top
| 1920
| 2008 
| Thuringian Evangelical Church
| Lutheran
|  parishioners (1922)the State of Thuringia in its borders of 1920, until 1934 except of the areas comprising the former Principality of Reuss Elder Line. In 1934 the Reuss elder line church body merged in the Thuringia church body. 
| This new church body was a merger of first seven, since 1934 eight church bodies of the Thuringian monarchies (such as Reuss Elder Line, Reuss Junior Line, Saxe-Altenburg, Saxe-Gotha, Saxe-Meiningen, Grand Duchy of Saxony, Schwarzburg-Rudolstadt, and Schwarzburg-Sondershausen). The official Thuringia church body became a very radical destroyed church, since it was taken over by Nazi-submissive German Christians, who gained a majority in the synod by the unconstitutional election imposed by Hitler on 23 July 1933. Nazi opponents formed the Confessing Church of Thuringia. 
|- valign=top
| 1873
| 1934 
| Waldeck and PyrmontEvangelical State Church of Waldeck and Pyrmont| United in administration
|  parishioners (1922)Free State of Waldeck-Pyrmont, since 1929 part of the Free State of Prussia as the District of Waldeck and the District of Pyrmont. Some small northern exclaves with Pyrmont in today's Lower Saxony were ceded in the 1920s to the Hanover Lutheran church body. 
| The official Waldeck church body became a destroyed church, since it was taken over by Nazi-submissive German Christians, who gained a majority in the synod by the unconstitutional election imposed by Hitler on 23 July 1933. However, a merger, planned since 1926, with the Frankfurt, Hesse state and Nassau church bodies failed after quarrels about their Nazi radicalism. In 1934 the Waldeck church body merged in the Evangelical Church of Electoral Hesse-Waldeck. 
|- valign=top
| 1870
| persisting 
| WürttembergEvangelical State Church in Württemberg
| Lutheran
|  parishioners (1922)Free People's State of Württemberg 
| The Württemberg official church body remained an intact church, since the Nazi-submissive German Christians remained a minority in the synod after the unconstitutional election imposed by Hitler on 23 July 1933. Nazi opponents of the Confessing Church could act within the church body.
|}

List of Landeskirchen after 1945 with changes until 2012
Those of the following Landeskirchen, which existed in 1948, founded the new Protestant umbrella Evangelical Church in Germany. However, following the violations of the church constitutions under Nazi reign many church bodies did not simply return to the pre-1933 status quo, but introduced altered or new church constitutions – usually after lengthy synodal procedures of decision-taking -, often including an altered name of the church body. In a process starting in June 1945 and ending in 1953 the Evangelical Church of the old-Prussian Union transformed from an integrated church body, subdivided into ecclesiastical provinces, into an umbrella-like church body, renamed into Evangelical Church of the Union under political pressure of communist East Germany in 1953.

The six old-Prussian ecclesiastical provinces (Kirchenprovinz[en], sg.[pl.]), which were not or not completely abolished by the expulsion of its parishioners from the Polish and Soviet annexed German territories, assumed independence as Landeskirchen of their own between 1945 and 1948, however, simultaneously remaining member churches within the Evangelical Church of the (old-Prussian) Union, thus rather converted into an umbrella. 
The communist dictatorship in East Germany imposed further name changes and administrative reorganisations along the inner German borders. This was reversed after unification.

There were mergers of church bodies in 1947, 1977, 1989, 2004, 2009, and 2012, and likely more are to come. The German demographic crisis and rising irreligionism influence them, especially in former East Germany. The first date given before every entry in the table below refers to the year, when the respective church body was constituted. Such a date of constitution is somewhat difficult to fix for the 19th century, when church constitutions were reformed and came into effect, which usually provided for more or less state-independent legislative and executive bodies more or less elected by parishioners. The Protestant Reformation and some church organisation of course existed long before.

For the last and this century the given years refer to the formal establishment of the respective church body. The second date refers to the year, when the respective church body ceased to exist (if so), due to a merger or unwinding. The third entry gives the name of each church body alphabetically assorted by the first territorial entity mentioned in the name. This makes sense because Landeskirchen have clear regional demarcations, therefore usually somehow mentioned in their names. The post-war German church bodies, listed below, have never existed all in the same time. The very independent and autonomous organisational structure of German Protestantism provides for unconcerted developments. One can assort the table below alphabetically or chronogically by clicking on the button with the gyronny of four.

List of further Protestant church bodies in Germany
This is a list of more Protestant church bodies, which were not members of the German Federation of Protestant Churches- 1918–1989: Evangelical Reformed Church in Bavaria (the Reformed parishes before included in the Lutheran Bavarian church body seceded and formed their own church body in 1918. In 1989 Evangelical Reformed Church in Bavaria merged into the Evangelical Reformed Church - Synod of Reformed Churches in Bavaria and Northwestern Germany – Territory: then the Free State of Bavaria right of the river Rhine
- Lower Saxon Confederation (Reformed) – Territory: Calvinist congregations, mostly of Huguenot foundation, in the Free State of Brunswick, the Free and Hanseatic Cities of Hamburg and Lübeck and the Prussian Province of Hanover.

List of today's Landeskirchen
For a list of today's Protestant Landeskirchen in Germany see their umbrella Evangelical Church in Germany.

List

Offices and institutions

Administration

In Switzerland
Switzerland has no country-wide state religion, though most of the cantons (except for Geneva and Neuchâtel) recognise official Landeskirchen, in all cases including the Roman Catholic Church and the Swiss Reformed Church. These churches, and in some cantons also the Old Catholic Church and Jewish congregations, are financed by official taxation of adherents.

Roman Catholic cantonal churches
In most cantons the Roman Catholic congregations are organised in cantonal church bodies which form statutory corporations with executive and supervising bodies elected by their parishioners. Roman Catholic Landeskirchen developed from denominationally separate committees of the cantonal governments in cantons with populations of mixed denomination, such as Aargau, Graubünden, St. Gallen and Thurgau. These separate government committees, competent for ecclesiastical matters of the respective denomination and founded in the 16th and 17th century, were sometimes called Corpus Catholicorum (for the Roman Catholics, with the equivalent Corpus Evangelicorum for the Reformed Protestants).

In other cantons with predominantly Reformed population, Roman Catholic Landeskirchen were founded after World War II (except for Berne whose Roman Catholic Regional Church had already been established in 1939), paralleling the long established Reformed Landeskirchen in those cantons and accounting for the recognition of Roman Catholicism as an equivalent denomination. Cantons of prevailingly Roman Catholic population then followed that example, first the Lucerne.

Church buildings and other real estate, religious schools, religious charitable organisations and religious counselling centres are often owned, run and financed by the funds of the cantonally competent Roman Catholic church body. Since each has executive and legislative bodies, elected by its statutory members (i.e. the parishioners of age), each Roman Catholic church body is accepted as a democratic entity entitled to levy member fees (also by way of a church tax), because the usage of the funds is decided by the elected representatives of those who defray them.

According to Roman Catholic doctrine the Roman Catholic church bodies are not churches, since there is only one hierarchic church. Therefore some Roman Catholics oppose the Roman Catholic Landeskirchen as para-ecclesiastical entities paralleling the actual Roman Catholic church, while many others support the idea since they offer Roman Catholics similar opportunities to participate in church life like the Reformed Landeskirchen.

Some cantonal church bodies bear the name Landeskirche in their name, others are called a synod, federation or association of congregations or simply Catholic Church of the respective Canton. Whereas the term Landeskirche actually implies that the body is a separate denomination, the term cantonal church'' would be more appropriate for Roman Catholic regional church bodies, since they form a cantonally delineated corporation of the Roman Catholic parishioners within a canton but are cooperating and providing services to their members, who in the canonical sense remain members of the Roman Catholic Church pastoring them by its respective diocese.

List of Roman Catholic Landeskirchen

The Roman Catholic Cantonal Church of Schwyz (Römisch-katholische Kantonalkirche Schwyz) enjoys the status of an associated guest.

List of Protestant Landeskirchen

See also
Evangelical Church in Germany (1945 – today)
German Evangelical Church (1933–1945)
Federation of Swiss Protestant Churches (1920 – today)

Notes

Protestantism in Switzerland
Protestantism in Germany